The Rhaetian Railway Ge 2/4 was a class of metre gauge 1′B1′ electric locomotives formerly operated by the Rhaetian Railway (RhB), which is the main railway network in the Canton of Graubünden, Switzerland.  Four members of the class are now preserved, with one of them in operational condition.

The class was so named under the Swiss locomotive and railcar classification system. According to that system, Ge 2/4 denotes a narrow gauge electric adhesion locomotive with a total of four axles, two of which are drive axles.

Technical details

As delivered

In 1912-1913, the Rhaetian Railway purchased seven examples of the Ge 2/4, numbered 201 to 207, for the newly constructed and electrified Engadin line. Their mechanical components were manufactured by the Swiss Locomotive and Machine Works (SLM), while Brown, Boveri & Cie (BBC) furnished the electrical components. To drive the Ge 2/4s, repulsion motors were used, as these motors were characterised by a high torque and shock-free startup.

Rebuilds
Between 1943 and 1946, three Ge 2/4 machines were rebuilt as shunting locomotives, with a new single phase motor and a central driver's cab. In the vernacular, they then received the name Bügeleisen (flat iron).

In 1945 and 1946, two further Ge 2/4s were rebuilt with a new single phase motor. They then soon began rendering service as pilot locomotives on the Albula Railway.

Preservation
The two unrebuilt locomotives, numbered 205 and 207, are both still in existence.

No. 205 stood until November 2007 as a memorial locomotive in front of the Zurich University of Applied Sciences in Winterthur.  Originally, this locomotive was intended to be a part of the, then in the planning stage, Albula railway museum.  The Rhaetian Railway's preservation society, Club 1889, is currently investigating other means of displaying the locomotive in the open air, but shielded from the weather, after completion of ongoing restoration work.  Meanwhile, no. 207 can be seen on display at the Swiss Transport Museum in Lucerne.

The last remaining example of the first three rebuilt locomotives (Ge 2/4 212) was withdrawn from service as recently as 2006, and is also now preserved.  It has been transformed back into its original 1940s condition, and sold to a private company that wants to set up the locomotive outside a planned model railway layout in Fribourg.

Ge 2/4 no. 222 from the second batch of rebuilds is the fourth preserved example of the class; it is based in Landquart as a heritage locomotive.

List of locomotives

See also

 History of rail transport in Switzerland
 Rail transport in Switzerland

References

 
 
 
 Peter Willen: Lokomotiven der Schweiz 2. Schmalspur Triebfahrzeuge. Orell Füssli Verlag, Zürich 1972, without ISBN

This article is based upon a translation of the German-language version, and includes some information taken from the Japanese-language version, as at January 2010. It has since been revised with information from Swiss sources.

SLM locomotives
Brown, Boveri & Cie locomotives
Electric locomotives of Switzerland
11 kV AC locomotives
Rhaetian Railway locomotives
Railway locomotives introduced in 1912
Metre gauge electric locomotives
1′B1′ locomotives